Daniel Foster (born 20 February 1982) is a former Australian rules footballer  for the Geelong Football Club in the Australian Football League (AFL), playing 17 games between 2000 and 2002. 

1982 births
Living people
Geelong Football Club players
Port Adelaide Magpies players
Australian rules footballers from South Australia